Haematopota subcylindrica is a species of horse-flies that can be found in such European countries as Austria, Belgium, Great Britain including the Isle of Man, Bulgaria, Czech Republic, Denmark, France, Germany, Hungary, Italy, Liechtenstein, Lithuania, Poland, Romania, Russia, Slovakia, Sweden, the Netherlands, and in all states of former Yugoslavia (except for North Macedonia). It can also be found in Near East including Middle East.

References

Tabanidae
Insects described in 1883
Diptera of Europe
Taxa named by Louis Pandellé